This list of birds of Vermont is a comprehensive listing of all the bird species recorded in the U.S. state of Vermont. This list is published by the Vermont Bird Records Committee (VBRC). As of November 2020 there were 388 species on the list. Of them, 103 are classed as vagrants anywhere in the state and 14 others are rare in certain regions. Of the vagrants, six are additionally classed as hypothetical (see below).  Seven species were introduced to North America or directly to Vermont, one is extinct, and two have been extirpated.

This list is presented in the taxonomic sequence of the Check-list of North and Middle American Birds, 7th edition through the 62nd Supplement, published by the American Ornithological Society (AOS). Common and scientific names are also those of the Check-list, except that the common names of families are from the Clements taxonomy because the AOS list does not include them.

Unless otherwise noted, all species listed below are considered to occur regularly in Vermont as permanent residents, summer or winter visitors, or migrants. These tags are used to annotate some species:

(V) Vagrant - birds that if observed anywhere in Vermont require more comprehensive documentation than regularly seen species
(B) - birds that if observed outside the Burlington area require documentation
(C) - birds that if observed outside the Lake Champlain Basin require documentation
(K) - birds that if observed outside the Northeast Highlands (Northeast Kingdom) require documentation
(I) Introduced - a species introduced to North America by the actions of man
(X) Extinct - a recent species that no longer exists
(E) Extirpated - a species no longer found in Vermont but existing elsewhere
(H) Hypothetical - "single records that lack photo documentation or second party confirmation" per the VBRC.

Ducks, geese, and waterfowl

Order: AnseriformesFamily: Anatidae

The family Anatidae includes the ducks and most duck-like waterfowl, such as geese and swans. These birds are adapted to an aquatic existence with webbed feet, bills which are flattened to a greater or lesser extent, and feathers that are excellent at shedding water due to special oils. Forty-three species have been recorded in Vermont.

Fulvous whistling-duck, Dendrocygna bicolor (V)
Snow goose, Anser caerulescens
Ross's goose, Anser rossii
Greater white-fronted goose, Anser albifrons
Pink-footed goose, Anser brachyrhynchus (V)
Brant, Branta bernicla
Barnacle goose, Branta leucopsis (V)
Cackling goose, Branta hutchinsii
Canada goose, Branta canadensis
Mute swan, Cygnus olor (I)
Trumpeter swan, Cygnus buccinator (V)
Tundra swan, Cygnus columbianus
Wood duck, Aix sponsa
Garganey, Spatula querquedula (V)
Blue-winged teal, Spatula discors
Northern shoveler, Spatula clypeata
Gadwall, Mareca strepera
Eurasian wigeon, Mareca penelope
American wigeon, Mareca americana
Mallard, Anas platyrhynchos
American black duck, Anas rubripes
Northern pintail, Anas acuta
Green-winged teal, Anas crecca
Canvasback, Aythya valisineria
Redhead, Aythya americana
Ring-necked duck, Aythya collaris
Tufted duck, Aythya fuligula (C)
Greater scaup, Aythya marila
Lesser scaup, Aythya affinis
King eider, Somateria spectabilis (V)
Common eider, Somateria mollissima
Harlequin duck, Histrionicus histrionicus (C)
Surf scoter, Melanitta perspicillata
White-winged scoter, Melanitta deglandi
Black scoter, Melanitta americana
Long-tailed duck, Clangula hyemalis
Bufflehead, Bucephala albeola
Common goldeneye, Bucephala clangula
Barrow's goldeneye, Bucephala islandica
Hooded merganser, Lophodytes cucullatus
Common merganser, Mergus merganser
Red-breasted merganser, Mergus serrator
Ruddy duck, Oxyura jamaicensis

New World quail
Order: GalliformesFamily: Odontophoridae

The New World quails are small, plump terrestrial birds only distantly related to the quails of the Old World, but named for their similar appearance and habits. One species has been recorded in Vermont.

Northern bobwhite, Colinus virginianus (I)

Pheasants, grouse, and allies
Order: GalliformesFamily: Phasianidae

Phasianidae consists of the pheasants and their allies. These are terrestrial species, variable in size but generally plump with broad, relatively short wings. Many species are gamebirds or have been domesticated as a food source for humans. Six species have been recorded in Vermont.

Wild turkey, Meleagris gallopavo
Ruffed grouse, Bonasa umbellus
Spruce grouse, Canachites canadensis (K)
Willow ptarmigan, Lagopus lagopus (V)
Gray partridge, Perdix perdix (I) (V)
Ring-necked pheasant, Phasianus colchicus (I)

Grebes
Order: PodicipediformesFamily: Podicipedidae

Grebes are small to medium-large freshwater diving birds. They have lobed toes and are excellent swimmers and divers. However, they have their feet placed far back on the body, making them quite ungainly on land. Four species and a species pair have been recorded in Vermont.

Pied-billed grebe, Podilymbus podiceps
Horned grebe, Podiceps auritus
Red-necked grebe, Podiceps grisegena
Eared grebe, Podiceps nigricollis (V)
Western grebe/Clark's grebe, Aechmorphorus occidentalis/Aechmorphorus clarkii (V)

Pigeons and doves
Order: ColumbiformesFamily: Columbidae

Pigeons and doves are stout-bodied birds with short necks and short slender bills with a fleshy cere. Six species have been recorded in Vermont.

Rock pigeon, Columba livia (I)
Band-tailed pigeon, Patagioenas fasciata (V)
Eurasian collared-dove, Streptopelia decaocto (V)
Passenger pigeon, Ectopistes migratorius (X)
White-winged dove, Zenaida asiatica (V)
Mourning dove, Zenaida macroura

Cuckoos
Order: CuculiformesFamily: Cuculidae

The family Cuculidae includes cuckoos, roadrunners, and anis. These birds are of variable size with slender bodies, long tails, and strong legs. Two species have been recorded in Vermont.

Yellow-billed cuckoo, Coccyzus americanus
Black-billed cuckoo, Coccyzus erythropthalmus

Nightjars and allies

Order: CaprimulgiformesFamily: Caprimulgidae

Nightjars are medium-sized nocturnal birds that usually nest on the ground. They have long wings, short legs, and very short bills. Most have small feet, of little use for walking, and long pointed wings. Their soft plumage is cryptically colored to resemble bark or leaves. Two species have been recorded in Vermont.

Common nighthawk,  Chordeiles minor
Eastern whip-poor-will, Antrostomus vociferus

Swifts
Order: ApodiformesFamily: Apodidae

The swifts are small birds which spend the majority of their lives flying. These birds have very short legs and never settle voluntarily on the ground, perching instead only on vertical surfaces. Many swifts have very long, swept-back wings which resemble a crescent or boomerang. One species has been recorded in Vermont.

Chimney swift, Chaetura pelagica

Hummingbirds
Order: ApodiformesFamily: Trochilidae

Hummingbirds are small birds capable of hovering in mid-air due to the rapid flapping of their wings. They are the only birds that can fly backwards. Two species have been recorded in Vermont.

Ruby-throated hummingbird, Archilochus colubris
Rufous hummingbird, Selasphorus rufus (V)

Rails, gallinules, and coots

Order: GruiformesFamily: Rallidae

Rallidae is a large family of small to medium-sized birds which includes the rails, crakes, coots, and gallinules. The most typical family members occupy dense vegetation in damp environments near lakes, swamps, or rivers. In general they are shy and secretive birds, making them difficult to observe. Most species have strong legs and long toes which are well adapted to soft uneven surfaces. They tend to have short, rounded wings and tend to be weak fliers. Six species have been recorded in Vermont.

Clapper rail, Rallus crepitans (V)
King rail, Rallus elegans (V)
Virginia rail, Rallus limicola
Sora, Porzana carolina
Common gallinule, Gallinula galeata
American coot, Fulica americana
Yellow rail, Coturnicops noveboracensis (V)

Cranes
Order: GruiformesFamily: Gruidae

Cranes are large, long-legged, and long-necked birds. Unlike the similar-looking but unrelated herons, cranes fly with necks outstretched, not pulled back. Most have elaborate and noisy courting displays or "dances". One species has been recorded in Vermont.

Sandhill crane, Antigone canadensis

Stilts and avocets
Order: CharadriiformesFamily: Recurvirostridae

Recurvirostridae is a family of large wading birds which includes the avocets and stilts. The avocets have long legs and long up-curved bills. The stilts have extremely long legs and long, thin, straight bills. One species has been recorded in Vermont.

American avocet, Recurvirostra americana (V)

Plovers and lapwings

Order: CharadriiformesFamily: Charadriidae

The family Charadriidae includes the plovers, dotterels, and lapwings. They are small to medium-sized birds with compact bodies, short thick necks, and long, usually pointed, wings. They are found in open country worldwide, mostly in habitats near water. Six species have been recorded in Vermont.

Black-bellied plover, Pluvialis squatarola
American golden-plover, Pluvialis dominica
Pacific golden-plover, Pluvialis fulva (H) (V)
Killdeer, Charadrius vociferus
Semipalmated plover, Charadrius semipalmatus
Common ringed plover, Charadrius hiaticula (V)
Piping plover, Charadrius melodus (V)

Sandpipers and allies

Order: CharadriiformesFamily: Scolopacidae

Scolopacidae is a large diverse family of small to medium-sized shorebirds including the sandpipers, curlews, godwits, shanks, tattlers, woodcocks, snipes, dowitchers, and phalaropes. The majority of these species eat small invertebrates picked out of the mud or soil. Different lengths of legs and bills enable multiple species to feed in the same habitat, particularly on the coast, without direct competition for food. Thirty-two species have been recorded in Vermont.

Upland sandpiper, Bartramia longicauda
Whimbrel, Numenius phaeopus
Black-tailed godwit, Limosa limosa (V)
Hudsonian godwit, Limosa haemastica
Marbled godwit, Limosa fedoa (V)
Ruddy turnstone, Arenaria interpres
Red knot, Calidris canutus (C)
Ruff, Calidris pugnax (V)
Stilt sandpiper, Calidris himantopus
Curlew sandpiper, Calidris ferruginea (V)
Sanderling, Calidris alba
Dunlin, Calidris alpina
Purple sandpiper, Calidris maritima
Baird's sandpiper, Calidris bairdii
Least sandpiper, Calidris minutilla
White-rumped sandpiper, Calidris fuscicollis
Buff-breasted sandpiper, Calidris subruficollis
Pectoral sandpiper, Calidris melanotos
Semipalmated sandpiper, Calidris pusilla
Western sandpiper, Calidris mauri (V)
Short-billed dowitcher, Limnodromus griseus
Long-billed dowitcher, Limnodromus scolopaceus
American woodcock, Scolopax minor
Wilson's snipe, Gallinago delicata
Spotted sandpiper, Actitis macularius
Solitary sandpiper, Tringa solitaria
Lesser yellowlegs, Tringa flavipes
Willet, Tringa semipalmata
Greater yellowlegs, Tringa melanoleuca
Wilson's phalarope, Phalaropus tricolor (C)
Red-necked phalarope, Phalaropus lobatus
Red phalarope, Phalaropus fulicarius

Skuas and jaegers
Order: CharadriiformesFamily: Stercorariidae

Skuas and jaegers are in general medium to large birds, typically with gray or brown plumage, often with white markings on the wings. They have longish bills with hooked tips and webbed feet with sharp claws. They look like large dark gulls, but have a fleshy cere above the upper mandible. They are strong, acrobatic fliers. Three species have been recorded in Vermont.

Pomarine jaeger, Stercorarius pomarinus (C)
Parasitic jaeger, Stercorarius parasiticus (C)
Long-tailed jaeger, Stercorarius longicaudus (C)

Auks, murres, and puffins
Order: CharadriiformesFamily: Alcidae

The family Alcidae includes auks, murres, and puffins. These are short-winged birds that live on the open sea and normally only come ashore for breeding. Six species have been recorded in Vermont.

Dovekie, Alle alle (V)
Common murre, Uria aalge (V)
Thick-billed murre, Uria lomvia (V)
Black guillemot, Cepphus grylle (V)
Ancient murrelet, Synthliboramphus antiquus (V)
Atlantic puffin, Fratercula arctica (V)

Gulls, terns, and skimmers

Order: CharadriiformesFamily: Laridae

Laridae is a family of medium to large seabirds and includes gulls, terns, kittiwakes, and skimmers. They are typically grey or white, often with black markings on the head or wings. They have stout, longish bills and webbed feet. Twenty-three species have been recorded in Vermont.

Black-legged kittiwake, Rissa tridactyla (C)
Ivory gull, Pagophila eburnea (V)
Sabine's gull, Xema sabini (C)
Bonaparte's gull,  Chroicocephalus philadelphia
Black-headed gull, Chroicocephalus ridibundus (C)
Little gull, Hydrocoleus minutus
Laughing gull, Leucophaeus atricilla (V)
Franklin's gull, Leucophaeus pipixcan (V)
Black-tailed gull, Larus crassirostris (V)
Ring-billed gull, Larus delawarensis
Herring gull, Larus argentatus
Iceland gull, Larus glaucoides
Lesser black-backed gull, Larus fuscus (C)
Slaty-backed gull, Larus schistisagus (V)
Glaucous gull, Larus hyperboreus
Great black-backed gull, Larus marinus
Sooty tern, Onychoprion fuscatus (V)
Caspian tern, Hydroprogne caspia
Black tern, Chlidonias niger
White-winged tern, Chlidonias leucopterus (V)
Common tern, Sterna hirundo
Arctic tern, Sterna paradisaea (V)
Forster's tern, Sterna forsteri (V)

Tropicbirds
Order: PhaethontiformesFamily: Phaethontidae

Tropicbirds are slender white birds of tropical oceans with exceptionally long central tail feathers. Their long wings have black markings, as does the head. One species has been recorded in Vermont.

White-tailed tropicbird, Phaethon lepturus (V)

Loons
Order: GaviiformesFamily: Gaviidae

Loons are aquatic birds the size of a large duck, to which they are unrelated. Their plumage is largely grey or black, and they have spear-shaped bills. Loons swim well and fly adequately, but are almost hopeless on land, because their legs are placed towards the rear of the body. Four species have been recorded in Vermont.

Red-throated loon, Gavia stellata
Arctic loon, Gavia arctica (H) (V)
Pacific loon, Gavia pacifica (V)
Common loon, Gavia immer

Southern storm-petrels
Order: ProcellariiformesFamily: Oceanitidae

The storm-petrels are the smallest seabirds, relatives of the petrels, feeding on planktonic crustaceans and small fish picked from the surface, typically while hovering. The flight is fluttering and sometimes bat-like. Until 2018, this family's three species were included with the other storm-petrels in family Hydrobatidae.

Wilson's storm-petrel, Oceanites oceanicus (V)

Northern storm-petrels
Order: ProcellariiformesFamily: Hydrobatidae

Though the members of this family are similar in many respects to the southern storm-petrels, including their general appearance and habits, there are enough genetic differences to warrant their placement in a separate family.

Leach's storm-petrel, Hydrobates leucorhous (V)
Band-rumped storm-petrel, Hydrobates castro (V)

Shearwaters and petrels
Order: ProcellariiformesFamily: Procellariidae

The procellariids are the main group of medium-sized "true petrels", characterized by united nostrils with medium septum and a long outer functional primary. Three species have been recorded in Vermont.

Northern fulmar, Fulmarus glacialis (V)
Cory's shearwater, Calonectris diomedea (V)
Great shearwater, Ardenna gravis (V)

Storks
Order: CiconiiformesFamily: Ciconiidae

Storks are large, heavy, long-legged, long-necked wading birds with long stout bills and wide wingspans. They lack the powder down that other wading birds such as herons, spoonbills and ibises use to clean off fish slime. Storks lack a pharynx and are mute. One species has been recorded in Vermont.

Wood stork, Mycteria americana (V)

Boobies and gannets
Order: SuliformesFamily: Sulidae

The sulids comprise the gannets and boobies. Both groups are medium-large coastal seabirds that plunge-dive for fish. Two species have been recorded in Vermont.

Brown booby, Sula leucogaster (V)
Northern gannet, Morus bassanus (C)

Anhingas

Order: SuliformesFamily: Anhingidae

Anhingas are cormorant-like water birds with very long necks and long, straight beaks. They are fish eaters which often swim with only their neck above the water. One species has been recorded in Vermont.

Anhinga, Anhinga anhinga (H) (V)

Cormorants and shags
Order: SuliformesFamily: Phalacrocoracidae

Cormorants are medium-to-large aquatic birds, usually with mainly dark plumage and areas of colored skin on the face. The bill is long, thin and sharply hooked. Their feet are four-toed and webbed. Two species have been recorded in Vermont.

Great cormorant, Phalacrocorax carbo
Double-crested cormorant, Nannopterum auritum

Pelicans

Order: PelecaniformesFamily: Pelecanidae

Pelicans are very large water birds with a distinctive pouch under their beak. Like other birds in the order Pelecaniformes, they have four webbed toes. Two species have been recorded in Vermont.

American white pelican, Pelecanus erythrorhynchos (V)
Brown pelican, Pelecanus occidentalis (V)

Herons, egrets, and bitterns

Order: PelecaniformesFamily: Ardeidae

The family Ardeidae contains the herons, egrets, and bitterns. Herons and egrets are medium to large wading birds with long necks and legs. Bitterns tend to be shorter necked and more secretive. Members of Ardeidae fly with their necks retracted, unlike other long-necked birds such as storks, ibises and spoonbills. Eleven species have been recorded in Vermont.

American bittern, Botaurus lentiginosus
Least bittern, Ixobrychus exilis
Great blue heron, Ardea herodias
Great egret, Ardea alba
Snowy egret, Egretta thula
Little blue heron, Egretta caerulea
Tricolored heron, Egretta tricolor (V)
Cattle egret, Bubulcus ibis
Green heron, Butorides virescens
Black-crowned night-heron, Nycticorax nycticorax
Yellow-crowned night-heron, Nyctanassa violacea (V)

Ibises and spoonbills
Order: PelecaniformesFamily: Threskiornithidae

The family Threskiornithidae includes the ibises and spoonbills. They have long, broad wings. Their bodies tend to be elongated, the neck more so, with rather long legs. The bill is also long, decurved in the case of the ibises, straight and distinctively flattened in the spoonbills. Two species have been recorded in Vermont.

White ibis, Eudocimus albus (H) (V)
Glossy ibis, Plegadis falcinellus

New World vultures
Order: CathartiformesFamily: Cathartidae

The New World vultures are not closely related to Old World vultures, but superficially resemble them because of convergent evolution. Like the Old World vultures, they are scavengers, however, unlike Old World vultures, which find carcasses by sight, New World vultures have a good sense of smell with which they locate carcasses. Two species have been recorded in Vermont.

Black vulture, Coragyps atratus
Turkey vulture, Cathartes aura

Osprey
Order: AccipitriformesFamily: Pandionidae

Pandionidae is a monotypic family of fish-eating birds of prey.  Its single species possesses a very large and powerful hooked beak, strong legs, strong talons, and keen eyesight.

Osprey, Pandion haliaetus

Hawks, eagles, and kites
Order: AccipitriformesFamily: Accipitridae

Accipitridae is a family of birds of prey which includes hawks, eagles, kites, harriers, and Old World vultures. These birds have very large powerful hooked beaks for tearing flesh from their prey, strong legs, powerful talons, and keen eyesight. Twelve species have been recorded in Vermont.

Swallow-tailed kite, Elanoides forficatus (V)
Golden eagle, Aquila chrysaetos
Northern harrier, Circus hudsonius
Sharp-shinned hawk, Accipiter striatus
Cooper's hawk, Accipiter cooperii
Northern goshawk, Accipiter gentilis
Bald eagle, Haliaeetus leucocephalus
Red-shouldered hawk, Buteo lineatus
Broad-winged hawk, Buteo platypterus
Swainson's hawk, Buteo swainsoni (V)
Red-tailed hawk, Buteo jamaicensis
Rough-legged hawk, Buteo lagopus

Barn-owls
Order: StrigiformesFamily: Tytonidae

Barn-owls are medium to large owls with large heads and characteristic heart-shaped faces. They have long strong legs with powerful talons. One species has been recorded in Vermont.

Barn owl, Tyto alba (V)

Owls
Order: StrigiformesFamily: Strigidae

Typical owls are small to large solitary nocturnal birds of prey. They have large forward-facing eyes and ears, a hawk-like beak, and a conspicuous circle of feathers around each eye called a facial disk. Ten species have been recorded in Vermont.

Eastern screech-owl, Megascops asio
Great horned owl, Bubo virginianus
Snowy owl, Bubo scandiacus
Northern hawk owl, Surnia ulula
Barred owl, Strix varia
Great gray owl, Strix nebulosa (V)
Long-eared owl, Asio otus
Short-eared owl, Asio flammeus
Boreal owl, Aegolius funereus (V)
Northern saw-whet owl, Aegolius acadicus

Kingfishers
Order: CoraciiformesFamily: Alcedinidae

Kingfishers are medium-sized birds with large heads, long, pointed bills, short legs, and stubby tails. One species has been recorded in Vermont.

Belted kingfisher, Megaceryle alcyon

Woodpeckers
Order: PiciformesFamily: Picidae

Woodpeckers are small to medium-sized birds with chisel-like beaks, short legs, stiff tails, and long tongues used for capturing insects. Some species have feet with two toes pointing forward and two backward, while several species have only three toes. Many woodpeckers have the habit of tapping noisily on tree trunks with their beaks. Ten species have been recorded in Vermont.

Lewis's woodpecker, Melanerpes lewis (V)
Red-headed woodpecker, Melanerpes erythrocephalus
Red-bellied woodpecker, Melanerpes carolinus
Yellow-bellied sapsucker, Sphyrapicus varius
American three-toed woodpecker, Picoides dorsalis (V)
Black-backed woodpecker, Picoides arcticus
Downy woodpecker, Dryobates pubescens
Hairy woodpecker, Dryobates villosus
Northern flicker, Colaptes auratus
Pileated woodpecker, Dryocopus pileatus

Falcons and caracaras
Order: FalconiformesFamily: Falconidae

Falconidae is a family of diurnal birds of prey, notably the falcons and caracaras. They differ from hawks, eagles, and kites in that they kill with their beaks instead of their talons. Five species have been recorded in Vermont.

American kestrel, Falco sparverius
Merlin, Falco columbarius
Gyrfalcon, Falco rusticolus (V)
Peregrine falcon, Falco peregrinus
Prairie falcon, Falco mexicanus (V)
Crested caracara, Caracara cheriway (V)

Tyrant flycatchers
Order: PasseriformesFamily: Tyrannidae

Tyrant flycatchers are Passerine birds which occur throughout North and South America. They superficially resemble the Old World flycatchers, but are more robust and have stronger bills. They do not have the sophisticated vocal capabilities of the songbirds. Most, but not all, are rather plain. As the name implies, most are insectivorous. Fourteen species have been recorded in Vermont.

Great crested flycatcher, Myiarchus crinitus
Western kingbird, Tyrannus verticalis (V)
Eastern kingbird, Tyrannus tyrannus
Scissor-tailed flycatcher, Tyrannus forficatus (V)
Fork-tailed flycatcher, Tyrannus savana (V)
Olive-sided flycatcher, Contopus cooperi
Eastern wood-pewee, Contopus virens
Yellow-bellied flycatcher, Empidonax flaviventris
Acadian flycatcher, Empidonax virescens (V)
Alder flycatcher, Empidonax alnorum
Willow flycatcher, Empidonax traillii
Least flycatcher, Empidonax minimus
Eastern phoebe, Sayornis phoebe
Say's phoebe, Sayornis saya (V)

Vireos, shrike-babblers, and erpornis
Order: PasseriformesFamily: Vireonidae

The vireos are a group of small to medium-sized passerine birds. They are typically greenish in color and resemble wood warblers apart from their heavier bills. Seven species have been recorded in Vermont.

White-eyed vireo, Vireo griseus
Yellow-throated vireo, Vireo flavifrons
Cassin's vireo, Vireo cassinii (V)
Blue-headed vireo, Vireo solitarius
Philadelphia vireo, Vireo philadelphicus
Warbling vireo, Vireo gilvus
Red-eyed vireo, Vireo olivaceus

Shrikes
Order: PasseriformesFamily: Laniidae

Shrikes are passerine birds known for their habit of catching other birds and small animals and impaling the uneaten portions of their bodies on thorns. A shrike's beak is hooked, like that of a typical bird of prey. Two species have been recorded in Vermont.

Loggerhead shrike, Lanius ludovicianus (V) (E)
Northern shrike, Lanius borealis

Crows, jays, and magpies
Order: PasseriformesFamily: Corvidae

The family Corvidae includes crows, ravens, jays, choughs, magpies, treepies, nutcrackers, and ground jays. Corvids are above average in size among the Passeriformes, and some of the larger species show high levels of intelligence. Six species have been recorded in Vermont.

Canada jay, Perisoreus canadensis
Steller's jay, Cyanocitta stelleri (H) (V)
Blue jay, Cyanocitta cristata
American crow, Corvus brachyrhynchos
Fish crow, Corvus ossifragus (B)
Common raven, Corvus corax

Tits, chickadees, and titmice
Order: PasseriformesFamily: Paridae

The Paridae are mainly small stocky woodland species with short stout bills. Some have crests. They are adaptable birds, with a mixed diet including seeds and insects. Three species have been recorded in Vermont.

Black-capped chickadee, Poecile atricapilla
Boreal chickadee, Poecile hudsonica
Tufted titmouse, Baeolophus bicolor

Larks
Order: PasseriformesFamily: Alaudidae

Larks are small terrestrial birds with often extravagant songs and display flights. Most larks are fairly dull in appearance. Their food is insects and seeds. One species has been recorded in Vermont.

Horned lark, Eremophila alpestris

Swallows
Order: PasseriformesFamily: Hirundinidae

The family Hirundinidae is adapted to aerial feeding. They have a slender streamlined body, long pointed wings, and a short bill with a wide gape. The feet are adapted to perching rather than walking, and the front toes are partially joined at the base. Seven species have been recorded in Vermont.

Bank swallow, Riparia riparia
Tree swallow, Tachycineta bicolor
Northern rough-winged swallow, Stelgidopteryx serripennis
Purple martin, Progne subis
Barn swallow, Hirundo rustica
Cliff swallow, Petrochelidon pyrrhonota
Cave swallow, Petrochelidon fulva (V)

Kinglets
Order: PasseriformesFamily: Regulidae

The kinglets are a small family of birds which resemble the titmice. They are very small insectivorous birds. The adults have colored crowns, giving rise to their names. Two species have been recorded in Vermont.

Ruby-crowned kinglet, Corthylio calendula
Golden-crowned kinglet, Regulus satrapa

Waxwings
Order: PasseriformesFamily: Bombycillidae

The waxwings are a group of passerine birds with soft silky plumage and unique red tips to some of the wing feathers. In the Bohemian and cedar waxwings, these tips look like sealing wax and give the group its name. These are arboreal birds of northern forests. They live on insects in summer and berries in winter. Two species have been recorded in Vermont.

Bohemian waxwing, Bombycilla garrulus
Cedar waxwing, Bombycilla cedrorum

Nuthatches
Order: PasseriformesFamily: Sittidae

Nuthatches are small woodland birds. They have the unusual ability to climb down trees head first, unlike other birds which can only go upwards. Nuthatches have big heads, short tails, and powerful bills and feet. Two species have been recorded in Vermont.

Red-breasted nuthatch, Sitta canadensis
White-breasted nuthatch, Sitta carolinensis

Treecreepers
Order: PasseriformesFamily: Certhiidae

Treecreepers are small woodland birds, brown above and white below. They have thin pointed down-curved bills which they use to extricate insects from bark. They have stiff tail feathers, like woodpeckers, which they use to support themselves on vertical trees. One species has been recorded in Vermont.

Brown creeper, Certhia americana

Gnatcatchers
Order: PasseriformesFamily: Polioptilidae

These dainty birds resemble Old World warblers in their structure and habits, moving restlessly through the foliage seeking insects. The gnatcatchers are mainly soft bluish gray in color and have the typical insectivore's long sharp bill. Many species have distinctive black head patterns (especially males) and long, regularly cocked, black-and-white tails. One species has been recorded in Vermont.

Blue-gray gnatcatcher, Polioptila caerulea

Wrens
Order: PasseriformesFamily: Troglodytidae

Wrens are small and inconspicuous birds, except for their loud songs. They have short wings and thin down-turned bills. Several species often hold their tails upright. All are insectivorous. Six species have been recorded in Vermont.

House wren, Troglodytes aedon
Winter wren, Troglodytes hiemalis
Sedge wren, Cistothorus platensis
Marsh wren, Cistothorus palustris
Carolina wren, Thryothorus ludovicianus
Bewick's wren, Thryomanes bewickii (V)

Mockingbirds and thrashers
Order: PasseriformesFamily: Mimidae

The mimids are a family of passerine birds which includes thrashers, mockingbirds, tremblers, and the New World catbirds. These birds are notable for their vocalization, especially their remarkable ability to mimic a wide variety of birds and other sounds heard outdoors. The species tend towards dull grays and browns in their appearance. Three species have been recorded in Vermont.

Gray catbird, Dumetella carolinensis
Brown thrasher, Toxostoma rufum
Northern mockingbird, Mimus polyglottos

Starlings
Order: PasseriformesFamily: Sturnidae

Starlings are small to medium-sized passerine birds with strong feet. Their flight is strong and direct and they are very gregarious. Their preferred habitat is fairly open country, and they eat insects and fruit. Plumage is typically dark with a metallic sheen. One species has been recorded in Vermont.

European starling, Sturnus vulgaris (I)

Thrushes and allies
Order: PasseriformesFamily: Turdidae

The thrushes are a group of passerine birds that occur mainly but not exclusively in the Old World. They are plump, soft plumaged, small to medium-sized insectivores or sometimes omnivores, often feeding on the ground. Many have attractive songs. Eleven species have been recorded in Vermont.

Eastern bluebird, Sialia sialis
Mountain bluebird, Sialia currucoides (V)
Townsend's solitaire, Myadestes townsendi (V)
Veery, Catharus fuscescens
Gray-cheeked thrush, Catharus minimus (V)
Bicknell's thrush, Catharus bicknelli
Swainson's thrush, Catharus ustulatus
Hermit thrush, Catharus guttatus
Wood thrush, Hylocichla mustelina
American robin, Turdus migratorius
Varied thrush, Ixoreus naevius (V)

Old World flycatchers
Order: PasseriformesFamily: Muscicapidae

The Old World flycatchers form a large family of small passerine birds. These are mainly small arboreal insectivores, many of which, as the name implies, take their prey on the wing. One species has been recorded in Vermont.

Northern wheatear, Oenanthe oenanthe (V)

Old World sparrows

Order: PasseriformesFamily: Passeridae

Old World sparrows are small passerine birds. In general, sparrows tend to be small plump brownish or greyish birds with short tails and short powerful beaks. Sparrows are seed eaters, but they also consume small insects. One species has been recorded in Vermont.

House sparrow, Passer domesticus (I)

Wagtails and pipits
Order: PasseriformesFamily: Motacillidae

Motacillidae is a family of small passerine birds with medium to long tails. They include the wagtails, longclaws, and pipits. They are slender ground-feeding insectivores of open country. One species has been recorded in Vermont.

American pipit, Anthus rubescens

Finches, euphonias, and allies
Order: PasseriformesFamily: Fringillidae

Finches are seed-eating passerine birds, that are small to moderately large and have a strong beak, usually conical and in some species very large. All have twelve tail feathers and nine primaries. These birds have a bouncing flight with alternating bouts of flapping and gliding on closed wings, and most sing well. Ten species have been recorded in Vermont.

Evening grosbeak, Coccothraustes vespertinus
Pine grosbeak, Pinicola enucleator
House finch, Haemorhous mexicanus (native to the southwestern U.S.; introduced in the east)
Purple finch, Haemorhous purpureus
Common redpoll, Acanthis flammea
Hoary redpoll, Acanthis hornemanni
Red crossbill, Loxia curvirostra
White-winged crossbill, Loxia leucoptera
Pine siskin, Spinus pinus
American goldfinch, Spinus tristis

Longspurs and snow buntings
Order: PasseriformesFamily: Calcariidae

The Calcariidae are a group of passerine birds that were traditionally grouped with the New World sparrows, but differ in a number of respects and are usually found in open grassy areas. Three species have been recorded in Vermont.

Lapland longspur, Calcarius lapponicus
Smith's longspur, Calcarius pictus (H) (V)
Snow bunting, Plectrophenax nivalis

New World sparrows
Order: PasseriformesFamily: Passerellidae

Until 2017, these species were considered part of the family Emberizidae. Most of the species are known as sparrows, but these birds are not closely related to the Old World sparrows which are in the family Passeridae. Many of these have distinctive head patterns. Twenty-four species have been recorded in Vermont.

Grasshopper sparrow, Ammodramus savannarum
Lark sparrow, Chondestes grammacus (V)
Lark bunting, Calamospiza melanocorys (V)
Chipping sparrow, Spizella passerina
Clay-colored sparrow, Spizella pallida
Field sparrow, Spizella pusilla
Fox sparrow, Passerella iliaca
American tree sparrow, Spizelloides arborea
Dark-eyed junco, Junco hyemalis
White-crowned sparrow, Zonotrichia leucophrys
Golden-crowned sparrow, Zonotrichia atricapilla (V)
Harris's sparrow, Zonotrichia querula (V)
White-throated sparrow, Zonotrichia albicollis
Vesper sparrow, Pooecetes gramineus
LeConte's sparrow, Ammospiza leconteii (V)
Nelson's sparrow, Ammospiza nelsoni
Henslow's sparrow, Centronyx henslowii (E) (V)
Savannah sparrow, Passerculus sandwichensis
Song sparrow, Melospiza melodia
Lincoln's sparrow, Melospiza lincolnii
Swamp sparrow, Melospiza georgiana
Green-tailed towhee, Pipilo chlorurus (V)
Spotted towhee, Pipilo maculatus (V)
Eastern towhee, Pipilo erythrophthalmus

Yellow-breasted chat
Order: PasseriformesFamily: Icteriidae

This species was historically placed in the wood-warblers (Parulidae) but nonetheless most authorities were unsure if it belonged there. It was placed in its own family in 2017.

Yellow-breasted chat, Icteria virens

Troupials and allies
Order: PasseriformesFamily: Icteridae

The icterids are a group of small to medium-sized, often colorful passerine birds restricted to the New World and include the grackles, New World blackbirds, and New World orioles. Most species have black as a predominant plumage color, often enlivened by yellow, orange, or red. Twelve species have been recorded in Vermont.

Yellow-headed blackbird, Xanthocephalus xanthocephalus (V)
Bobolink, Dolichonyx oryzivorus
Eastern meadowlark, Sturnella magna
Western meadowlark, Sturnella neglecta (V)
Orchard oriole, Icterus spurius
Bullock's oriole, Icterus bullockii (V)
Baltimore oriole, Icterus galbula
Red-winged blackbird, Agelaius phoeniceus
Brown-headed cowbird, Molothrus ater
Rusty blackbird, Euphagus carolinus
Brewer's blackbird, Euphagus cyanocephalus (V)
Common grackle, Quiscalus quiscula

New World warblers
Order: PasseriformesFamily: Parulidae

The wood-warblers are a group of small and often colorful passerine birds restricted to the New World. Most are arboreal, but some like the ovenbird and the two waterthrushes, are more terrestrial. Most members of this family are insectivores. Thirty-six species have been recorded in Vermont.

Ovenbird, Seiurus aurocapilla
Worm-eating warbler, Helmitheros vermivorum (V)
Louisiana waterthrush, Parkesia motacilla
Northern waterthrush, Parkesia noveboracensis
Golden-winged warbler, Vermivora chrysoptera
Blue-winged warbler, Vermivora cyanoptera
Black-and-white warbler, Mniotilta varia
Prothonotary warbler, Protonotaria citrea (V)
Swainson's warbler, Limnothlypis swainsonii (V)
Tennessee warbler, Leiothlypis peregrina
Orange-crowned warbler, Leiothlypis celata
Nashville warbler, Leiothlypis ruficapilla
Connecticut warbler, Oporornis agilis
Mourning warbler, Geothlypis philadelphia
Kentucky warbler, Geothlypis formosa (V)
Common yellowthroat, Geothlypis trichas
Hooded warbler, Setophaga citrina 
American redstart, Setophaga ruticilla
Cape May warbler, Setophaga tigrina
Cerulean warbler, Setophaga cerulea
Northern parula, Setophaga americana
Magnolia warbler, Setophaga magnolia
Bay-breasted warbler, Setophaga castanea
Blackburnian warbler, Setophaga fusca
Yellow warbler, Setophaga petechia
Chestnut-sided warbler, Setophaga pensylvanica
Blackpoll warbler, Setophaga striata
Black-throated blue warbler, Setophaga caerulescens
Palm warbler, Setophaga palmarum
Pine warbler, Setophaga pinus
Yellow-rumped warbler, Setophaga coronata
Yellow-throated warbler, Setophaga dominica (V)
Prairie warbler, Setophaga discolor
Black-throated green warbler, Setophaga virens
Canada warbler, Cardellina canadensis
Wilson's warbler, Cardellina pusilla

Cardinals and allies
Order: PasseriformesFamily: Cardinalidae

The cardinals are a family of robust seed-eating birds with strong bills. They are typically associated with open woodland. The sexes usually have distinct plumages. Ten species have been recorded in Vermont.

Summer tanager, Piranga rubra (V)
Scarlet tanager, Piranga olivacea
Western tanager, Piranga ludoviciana (V)
Northern cardinal, Cardinalis cardinalis
Rose-breasted grosbeak, Pheucticus ludovicianus
Black-headed grosbeak, Pheucticus melanocephalus (V)
Blue grosbeak, Passerina caerulea (V)
Indigo bunting, Passerina cyanea
Painted bunting, Passerina ciris (V)
Dickcissel, Spiza americana

See also
List of mammals of Vermont
List of birds
Lists of birds by region
List of North American birds

References

External links
Vermont Bird Records Committee.

Vermont
birds